"The Cigarette Duet" is a song by New Zealand recording artist Princess Chelsea featuring Jonathan Bree for her debut studio album, Lil' Golden Book (2011); it appears as the sixth track on the album. The song was written by Chelsea Nikkel. "The Cigarette Duet" was released as the album's third single on 9 June 2011. The video of the song was posted to YouTube on 7 June 2011.

Writing and recording
The song is about a couple who fight over the health risks of smoking. The woman in the song is a (light) smoker, while the man is trying to encourage her to stop smoking. In the song, we learn the man was a previous smoker, but later quit. The lyrics are often compared to Nancy & Lee with its dialogue. In an interview, she said "I sort of knew when I wrote it if any of my songs are going to get big, it’s probably this one that’s going to be successful and it has put a lot of people onto my music."

A friend named 'Jamie-Lee' is mentioned in the song, who later wrote the song "No Church on Sunday" for Princess Chelsea's second studio album The Great Cybernetic Depression.

Release and critical response
The song is characterized by its catchy melody, dreamy vocals, and dark humor. The lyrics tell the story of a couple who are smoking cigarettes together, and the man warns the woman that smoking will kill her. The woman responds by saying that she doesn't care, because she loves smoking and wants to die young.

The song was released on 9 June 2011 as a single with B-side "Positive Guy Meets Negative Man". The song gained popularity once its music video was released. The song also led to her being featured on The Guardian's "New Band of the Day". The video was acknowledged by Welsh singer/songwriter  MARINA, which also gave it a boost in popularity.

 the video for "The Cigarette Duet" on YouTube has reached 85 million views. Chelsea said in an interview that some responses were not entirely correct. "Some people think Princess Chelsea is a male/female duo because they’ve watched the YouTube clip and they’re like 'Oh yeah this is pretty cool. They do 60’s pop' and I’m like 'kind of, but not really!'"

The song is noted for its consistent 420 references. Once in the length of the song, on the European Tour Edition cover, and lastly at the end of the video.

Music video
The music video is the main reason the song gained popularity. The video is referred to as an "anti-music video" by Bree. The video was directed by Jonathan Bree and released on 7 June 2011. In an interview, Chelsea said the video took about 70 takes before it was perfect. The first twenty takes featured Chelsea without the wig, but said she disliked her hair. She also said the "deadpan, bored" expression was true because they were exhausted after all of the takes.

The video opens with Bree and Chelsea sitting still in a hot tub with a tropical background. Chelsea is wearing a short pink wig. She looks at the pool thermometer, then resumes staying still. When the lyrics start, they proceed to sing the song, not moving anything but their lips. When the first verse ends, a guitar floats to the couple carrying a glass of beer for Bree and a glass of wine for Chelsea. When the second verse ends, the scene cuts to Chelsea smoking a cigarette and coughing as Bree is cleaning out the pool. When the third verse ends, the video cuts to an underwater scene in which Bree is swimming while attempting to play the electric guitar. A silhouette of Chelsea then shows her lighting and smoking a cigarette. As the video returns to the pool scene, the video fades to "In 2010, over 420 couples in New Zealand split due to problems associated with cigarette smoking" typed across the screen.

Track listing

The Cigarette Duet (European Tour Edition)

The Cigarette Duet (European Tour Edition) is the first extended play by Princess Chelsea. The extended play follows the official release of Chelsea's single "The Cigarette Duet" and includes one new song and three previously released songs.

Track listing

References

2011 songs
2011 singles
2012 debut EPs
Princess Chelsea songs
Songs about tobacco